Events from the year 1955 in Scotland.

Incumbents 

 Secretary of State for Scotland and Keeper of the Great Seal – James Stuart

Law officers 
 Lord Advocate – James Latham Clyde until January; then William Rankine Milligan
 Solicitor General for Scotland – William Rankine Milligan until January; then William Grant

Judiciary 
 Lord President of the Court of Session and Lord Justice General – Lord Clyde
 Lord Justice Clerk – Lord Thomson
 Chairman of the Scottish Land Court – Lord Gibson

Events 
 1955 – Dounreay Nuclear Power Development Establishment founded with the primary aim to develop Dounreay as the site for testing previously untried fast breeder reactor technology.
 24 February – a big freeze across the UK results in many roads being blocked with snow; Caithness is practically cut off. The Royal Air Force works to deliver food and medical supplies to the worst affected areas.
 21 March – American evangelist Billy Graham begins a seven-week Scottish crusade at the Kelvin Hall, Glasgow.
 1 April – the South of Scotland Electricity Board is formed by merger.
 23 April – the Scottish Cup Final is broadcast live on television for the first time. Clyde F.C. draw 1-1 with Celtic, winning the replay 1-0.
 19 May – Greenock Coin Hoard found.
 27 May – United Kingdom general election: In Scotland, as throughout the UK as a whole, the Conservatives have a majority of seats.
 25 June – the Scottish Aviation Twin Pioneer STOL transport aircraft, built at Prestwick, first flies.
 30 June – two Hawker Sea Hawk jet fighters flying from RNAS Lossiemouth independently crash into the North Sea; one pilot is killed.
 30 September – first electricity supply to the isolated railway community at Riccarton Junction.
 10 November – a major fire in Edinburgh destroys the footwear warehouse of C. W. Carr Aitkman in Jeffrey Street.
 11 November – a second major fire in Edinburgh largely destroys the C&A fashion store in Princes Street.
 9 December – Cumbernauld is designated a New town.
 14 December – RMS Carinthia is launched at John Brown & Company's shipyard on Clydebank for the Cunard Line's Canadian service.
 The collection of the world's first Museum of Childhood is established on Edinburgh's Royal Mile (initially at Lady Stair’s House) by optician Patrick Murray.
 Archaeological excavations on St Ninian's Isle begin.

Births 
 18 January – Robin Wales, Labour politician, mayor of the London Borough of Newham
 3 February – Kirsty Wark, television presenter
 19 March – John Burnside, writer
 31 March – Angus Young, rock musician
 23 April – Allan Forsyth, footballer
 2 May – Willie Miller, footballer
 5 May – John Stroyan, Anglican bishop
 14 May – Alasdair Fraser, fiddler
 4 June – Val McDermid, crime novelist
 13 June – Alan Hansen, footballer and television presenter
 1 July – Candia McWilliam, fiction writer
 8 July – Douglas Flint, banker
 12 July – Robin Robertson, poet, novelist and editor
 25 August – John McGeoch guitarist (died 2004 in England)
 11 October – Sally Magnusson, journalist and broadcast presenter
 12 October – Aggie MacKenzie, television presenter
 28 October – Jeff Stewart, actor
 12 November – Les McKeown, pop-rock singer (died 2021)
 22 November – Mary Macmaster, harpist
 2 December – Janice Galloway, writer
 6 December – Anne Begg, Labour politician
 23 December – Carol Ann Duffy, poet

Deaths 
 21 February – Sir Henry Wade, surgeon (born 1876)
 26 February – Agnes Mure Mackenzie, writer and historian (born 1891)
 3 March – Lewis Spence, writer and folklorist (born 1874)
 11 March – Sir Alexander Fleming, bacteriologist, recipient of the Nobel Prize in Physiology or Medicine (born 1881; died in London)
 22 April – Herbert MacNair, artist (born 1868)
 11 October – Hector McNeil, politician (born 1907)
 Mary Newbery Sturrock, artist and designer (born 1890)
 Salvador Ysart, glassblower (born 1878 in Barcelona)

The arts
 Robin Jenkins's novel The Cone Gatherers is published.
 Sandy MacMillan, Thomas Limond and Ross Taylor's Scots language nursery rhyme collection Bairnsangs is published, as by Sandy Thomas Ross.
 Edith Anne Robertson's Scots language poetry collections Voices frae the city o trees; and ither voices frae nearbye and Poems Frae the Suddron O Walter De La Mare Made Ower Intil Scots are published.

See also 
 1955 in Northern Ireland

References 

 
Scotland
Years of the 20th century in Scotland
1950s in Scotland